Peder Christian Hersleb Kjerschow (29 June 1786 – 24 November 1866) was a Norwegian clergyman.

Biography
He was  born at Rødøy in  Nordland, Norway. He was the son of the Danish-born priest Rasmus Sundt Christensen Kjerschow (1739–1806) and his wife Benedicte Maria Pedersdatter Hersleb (born 1744). His father  was a vicar in Brønnøy, who had migrated to Norway from Jutland. He was a student at Trondheim Cathedral School and earned his cand.theol. in 1808.

From 1814, he was  a resident chapel in Aker Prestegjeld, where he served under  parish priest Claus Pavels (1769–1822). In 1823,  he became a parish priest in Aker. In 1830, he was added as the second bishop of the Diocese of Tromsø.
He was a bishop in the Church of Norway for twenty-seven years; first in  Tromsø from 1830 to 1848 and later in the Diocese of Bjørgvin from 1848 to 1857.

Personal life
Peder Kjerschow married Johanne Benedicte Collett (1802–1851), daughter of mining director Christian Ancher Collett and cousin of Peter Jonas and Johan Christian Collett. They had seven children of which two died young. Their son Christian Collett Kjerschow became a County Governor, while their daughter married businessman Jacob Andreas Michelsen. His grandson Peter Christian Hersleb Kjerschow Michelsen was named after him, but is better known as Christian Michelsen, statesman and prime minister.

References

1786 births
1866 deaths
People from Helgeland
People educated at the Trondheim Cathedral School
Bishops of Hålogaland
Bishops of Bjørgvin
19th-century Lutheran bishops
Norwegian people of Danish descent